Campo de Cariñena is a comarca in central Aragon, Spain. It is located in the province of Zaragoza, in the transitional area between the Iberian System and the Ebro Valley. The most important town is Cariñena.

It is a traditional wine-producing region located between rivers Jalón and Huerva. There are about 15,705 hectares of vineyards in this region.
This comarca has a dry, continental climate, with marked seasonal changes, the summers are hot and relatively short compared with the long cold winters.

See also
Cariñena (DO)
Comarcas of Aragon

References

External links 

 Comarcas de Aragón, Campo de Cariñena
Aragon Guide - Cariñena Wine & Wineries

Comarcas of Aragon
Geography of the Province of Zaragoza
Wine regions of Spain
Aragonese cuisine